RC Epokha-Polytechnic (RK Epokha-Politekhnik) is a Ukrainian rugby club in Kyiv. They currently play in Group B of the Ukraine Rugby Superliga.

History
The club was founded in 1962 as a university team of Kyiv Polytechnic Institute.

Honors
Ukrainian Championship
 1975, 1976, 1989, 1991, 1992, 1993, 1994, 1995, 1996, 1997

External links
RC Epokha-Polytechnic

Rugby clubs established in 1962
Ukrainian rugby union teams
Sport in Kyiv
1962 establishments in Ukraine
Igor Sikorsky Kyiv Polytechnic Institute